Certain verses (āyāt) from the Qur'an have been a subject of controversy among scholars.
The 216th verse of the Surah, Al-Baqara (The Cow) is about Jihad in the way of God.

Transliteration:

"Kutiba ʿalaykumu l-qitālu wahuwa kurhun lakum waʿasā ʾan takrahū šayʾan wahuwa ḫayrun lakum waʿasā ʾan tuḥibbū šayʾan wahuwa šarrun llakum w-Allāhu yaʿlamu wāʾantum lā taʿlāmūna."

Translations and commentary
Sahih International:

Abdullah Yusuf Ali:

 Abdullah Yusuf Ali's commentary on this verse is:

Muhammad Taqi-ud-Din al-Hilali:

Criticisms and response

Abdul Majid Daryabadi also explains the historical context of this verse:

Further reading 
 Online Quran Project includes the Qur'an translation of Abdul Majid Daryabadi.
 The Qur'an and War: Observations on Islamic Just War
 Chapter Introductions to the Qur'an - by Syed Abu-Ala' Maududi
 Tafheem-ul Qur'an Towards Understanding the Qur'an (translated by Zafar Ishaq Ansari)
 Terrorism and Jihad: An Islamic Perspective - Part - 3 by Zakir Naik
 Terrorism and Jihad: An Islamic Perspective - Part - 4 by Zakir Naik

See also

References 

Quranic verses
Al-Baqara
Jihad